Dominique Veilex (born 1 January 1960) is a former professional footballer and current manager. On 24 June 2010, he was named manager of then-amateur club Gazélec Ajaccio. In the ensuing two seasons, Veilex led the club to promotion to the Championnat National in the 2010–11 season and helped the club reach Ligue 2 after finishing third in the 2011–12 edition of the Championat National, thus helping Gazélec attain professional status. He signed a new two-year contract with Gazélec before the 2012–13 season, but only led the club for one Ligue 2 match.

He later managed ES Uzès Pont du Gard, Colomiers, and AS Excelsior.

References

External links 
 

1960 births
Living people
French footballers
Association football midfielders
AS Cannes players
Ligue 2 players
French football managers
Gazélec Ajaccio managers
SC Toulon managers